At the 1998 FIFA World Cup Croatia participated in the event for the first time. The country went on to finish third.

Qualifications
Croatia was drawn in Group A of UEFA's World Cup qualifications along with Bosnia and Herzegovina, Denmark, Greece, and Slovenia. Croatia finished second, behind Denmark, and qualified for the World Cup. The team had the following results: 

The final standings were the following:

Players 

Team captain Zvonimir Boban is the only players that appeared in all 10 qualifying matches. Davor Šuker was top scorer with 5 goals. Ardian Kozniku, Petar Krpan, Anthony Šerić and Vladimir Vasilj did not appear in any of the qualifying matches but made the final World Cup squad.

Complete list of players in the qualifying matches
{|class="wikitable sortable" style="text-align: center;"
|-
!width=50px|#
!class="unsortable" width=150px|Name
!width=50px|Games Played
!width=50px|Goals
|-
| 1
| Zvonimir Boban 
| 10
| 3
|-
|rowspan="4"| 2
| Davor Šuker
| 9 
| 5 
|-
!  style="background-color: #ffdddd"  | Alen Bokšić
| 9 
| 4 
|-
| Slaven Bilić
| 9 
| 3 
|-
| Aljoša Asanović
| 9 
| 0
|-
|rowspan="2"| 6
| Goran Vlaović
| 8
| 2
|-
| Robert Jarni
| 8
| 0
|-
|rowspan="4"| 8
| Zvonimir Soldo
| 7
| 1
|-
| Dario Šimić
| 7 
| 1
|-
| Goran Jurić
| 7 
| 0
|-
| Dražen Ladić
| 7
| 0
|-
|rowspan="2"| 12
| Robert Prosinečki
| 6 
| 1
|-
!  style="background-color: #ffdddd"  | Igor Cvitanović
| 6
| 0
|-
|rowspan="2"| 14
!  style="background-color: #ffdddd"  | Nikola Jerkan
| 4
| 0
|-
| Krunoslav Jurčić
| 4
| 0
|-
|rowspan="4"| 16
| Silvio Marić
| 3 
| 1
|-
!  style="background-color: #ffdddd"  | Niko Kovač
| 3
| 0
|-
| Marjan Mrmić
| 3
| 0
|-
| Igor Štimac
| 3
| 0
|-
|rowspan="4"| 20
!  style="background-color: #ffdddd"  | Tomislav Erceg
| 2 
| 0
|-
!  style="background-color: #ffdddd"  | Tonči Gabrić
| 2
| 0
|-
!  style="background-color: #ffdddd"  | Nenad Pralija
| 2 
| 0
|-
| Mario Stanić
| 2 
| 0
|-
|rowspan="4"| 24
!  style="background-color: #ffdddd"  | Nikola Jurčević
| 1 
| 0
|-
| Zoran Mamić
| 1 
| 0
|-
!  style="background-color: #ffdddd"  | Daniel Šarić
| 1 
| 0
|-
| Igor Tudor
| 1 
| 0
|-

World Cup Squad
Head coach: Miroslav Blažević

Croatia at the World Cup
At the World Cup, Croatia was drawn into Group H along with Argentina, Jamaica, Japan. The team advanced to the round of sixteen, finishing in second place in the group. The team had the following results: 

June 14, 1998

June 20, 1998

June 26, 1998

Croatia went on to face the Romanian squad in the round of sixteen. 

June 30, 1998

Croatia then played the heavily favoured German squad in the quarter-finals after their victory over Romania. 

July 4, 1998

After this surprise victory, Croatia played the host French team.

July 8, 1998

Croatia lost the match against France, ending their World Cup dreams. However, they entered the third place consolation match against the Netherlands.

July 11, 1998

With this victory, Croatia finished in third, becoming the surprise of the tournament. Striker Davor Šuker also earned the tournament's Golden Boot for his six goals.

References

 
Franjo Bučar Award winners
Countries at the 1998 FIFA World Cup
Modern history of Croatia